Skycity is an 80-story unfinished skyscraper in Mandaluyong, Philippines. It is a joint venture between real estate developer E. Ganzon Inc. (EGI) and Sam Buena Realty Corporation. Its estimated height is 335 metres (1,099 ft). If constructed, it will become the tallest building in the country. Skycity is planned as a mixed-used skyscraper with a hotel, office space and residential space.

Construction was suspended due to a lawsuit filed by a homeowners' association from nearby upscale Greenhills East Village. As of September 14, 2005, the Philippine Court of Appeals promulgated a resolution allowing the developers to resume construction of the skyscraper. As of 2008, no construction work had proceeded on the excavation area, which is the only completed phase of the project. In 2010, the second division of the Philippine Supreme Court rejected the challenges of the Greenhills East Association, and the developer said that the project (now described as a 77-story building with 8 basements) would proceed.

See also 
 List of tallest buildings in Metro Manila

References

External links
 Skycity, Mandaluyong on Emporis

Skyscrapers in Metro Manila
Buildings and structures in Mandaluyong
Unfinished buildings and structures
Proposed buildings and structures in Metro Manila